The rufous-capped spinetail (Synallaxis ruficapilla) is a species of bird in the family Furnariidae. It is found in the southern Atlantic Forest. Its natural habitats are subtropical or tropical moist lowland forest, subtropical or tropical moist montane forest, and heavily degraded former forest.

References

rufous-capped spinetail
Birds of the Atlantic Forest
rufous-capped spinetail
Taxa named by Louis Jean Pierre Vieillot
Taxonomy articles created by Polbot